Sir John Eltringham Coulson  (1909–1997) was a British diplomat who was ambassador to Sweden and secretary-general of EFTA.

Coulson was born 13 September 1909. He was educated at Rugby School and Corpus Christi College, Cambridge. He joined the Diplomatic Service in 1932. He served at Bucharest, Paris, New York and Washington, DC, before being appointed Ambassador to Sweden 1960–1963. He was then Deputy Under-Secretary of State at the Foreign Office 1963–1965, Chief of Administration of HM Diplomatic Service briefly from January to September 1965, and Secretary-General of the European Free Trade Association 1965–1972. He died 15 November 1997.

Honours
John Coulson was appointed CMG in the King's Birthday Honours of 1946 and knighted KCMG in the Queen's Birthday Honours of 1957. The Swedish government made him a Knight Grand Cross of the Order of the Polar Star.

References
COULSON, Sir John Eltringham, Who Was Who, A & C Black, 1920–2008; online edn, Oxford University Press, December 2012

1909 births
1997 deaths
20th-century British diplomats
Alumni of Corpus Christi College, Cambridge
Ambassadors of the United Kingdom to Sweden
Commanders Grand Cross of the Order of the Polar Star
European Free Trade Association
Knights Commander of the Order of St Michael and St George
People educated at Rugby School